Zall-Bastar is a village and administrative unit in the municipality of Tirana, central Albania. As of the 2011 census, the administrative unit of Zall-Bastar had an estimated population of 3,380 of whom 1,732 were men and 1,648 women.

Demographic history 
the village of Bastari appears in the Ottoman defter of 1467 as a part of the timar of Mustafa in the nahiyah of Benda. It was a relatively small settlement with a total of only five households which were represented by: Miho Manesi, Gjon Guribardi, Gjergj Shurbi, Kola Zhari, and Dom Miho.

References 

Villages in Tirana County
Administrative units of Tirana
Former municipalities in Tirana County